Motiejus or Matas Šumauskas (2 October 1905 in Kaunas – 28 May 1982 in Vilnius) was a Lithuanian communist activist and Soviet politician. He served as the chairman of the Council of Ministers (equivalent to Prime Minister) from 1956 to 1963 and chairman of the presidium of the Supreme Soviet of the Lithuanian SSR (de jure head of state) from 1967 to 1975.

Šumauskas received only primary education and earned a living working at a printing press. He joined the Lithuanian Communist Party in 1924. For his communist activities he was jailed in 1929, served a six-year sentence from 1931 to 1937, and was imprisoned again in 1939. Šumauskas was freed after the Soviet ultimatum in June 1940 and was elected to the People's Seimas. He became chairman of the trade unions and People's Commissar of Local Industry of the Lithuanian SSR. During World War II he retreated to the Russian SFSR, joined the 16th Rifle Division and was a Soviet partisan leader in the environs of Švenčionys and Lake Narach.

After the war, Šumauskas became deputy chairman of the Council of People's Commissars (1944–1950, 1953–1954). He replaced Mečislovas Gedvilas as the chairman of the Council of Ministers in 1956. Gedvilas was demoted to Minister of Education due to tensions between him and Antanas Sniečkus, the First Secretary of the Lithuanian Communist Party. From 1967 to 1975 Šumauskas served as the chairman of the presidium of the Supreme Soviet of the Lithuanian SSR and the deputy chairman of the presidium of the Supreme Soviet of the Soviet Union. He was also a member of the Politburo of the Central Committee of the Lithuanian Communist Party.

References

External links
 Full-text of Wonderful deeds ahead (1960) by Motiejus Šumauskas

1905 births
1982 deaths
Burials at Antakalnis Cemetery
Politicians from Kaunas
People from Kovensky Uyezd
Central Committee of the Communist Party of the Soviet Union candidate members
Second convocation members of the Supreme Soviet of the Soviet Union
Third convocation members of the Supreme Soviet of the Soviet Union
Fourth convocation members of the Supreme Soviet of the Soviet Union
Fifth convocation members of the Supreme Soviet of the Soviet Union
Sixth convocation members of the Supreme Soviet of the Soviet Union
Seventh convocation members of the Supreme Soviet of the Soviet Union
Eighth convocation members of the Supreme Soviet of the Soviet Union
Ninth convocation members of the Supreme Soviet of the Soviet Union
Members of the Central Committee of the Communist Party of Lithuania
Heads of state of the Lithuanian Soviet Socialist Republic
Heads of government of the Lithuanian Soviet Socialist Republic
Members of the Supreme Soviet of the Lithuanian Soviet Socialist Republic
Soviet partisans